FX Networks, LLC, is a company consisting of a network of cable channels plus a production company and a subsidiary of the Disney Entertainment segment of The Walt Disney Company. Originally a part of 21st Century Fox, the company was acquired by The Walt Disney Company on March 20, 2019. Consequently, FX Networks was integrated into the newly renamed Walt Disney Television unit.

History
Fox Broadcasting started up its fX unit by November 1993 under president Anne Sweeney Chuck Saftler was hired in November 1993. Coming from KTLA TV station, Mark Sonnenberg was recruited as first head of programming. On June 1, 1994, the fX cable channel premiered. Early the next month, Fox Broadcasting chair Lucie Salhany and fX was then transferred in a reorganization soon thereafter under Fox Television chair and CEO Chase Carey.

In mid-July 1994, a movie sister channel was announced under the working name of The Fox Movie Studio, also under Sweeney under the title of president of fX and Fox Movie Studio, to start airing in the fall. FX Networks launched the Fox Movie Studio on October 31, 1994, as fXM: Movies from Fox. fXM: Movies from Fox on March 1, 2000, was renamed Fox Movie Channel. Sweeney left for Disney in February 1996. She was replaced by Sonnenberg, who remained until 1998. Peter Liguori was appointed to replace him.

The FX289 channel for UK and Ireland launched in January 2004 then rebranded as FX as it moved in the Sky EPG in April 2005. The channel was rebranded as Fox on 11 January 2013.

John Landgraf joined as president of entertainment in 2004 then promoted in 2005 to president and general manager of FX Networks. In that span, FX's original series increased to two to 11, which was a factor in starting an in-house production company.

In August 2007, FX Productions was formed to take stakes in FX programming. FX acquired a number of non-Fox films for the channels. Landgraf was elevated to CEO of FX Networks and FX Productions in June 2013 while taking charge of FXNow digital video-on-demand platform. On March 28, 2013, FX president John Landgraf announced their upcoming launch of a new channel, FXX. Landgraf described the channel as "slightly more comedy focused" and aimed at younger audiences 18-34 compared with FX's programming and viewers aged 25–54, respectively. The channel was launched alongside the new tagline, "Fearless", that was implemented during 2013 across the channels of FX Networks. These announcements were part of FX Networks' plans to further distinguish itself from the "sameness" of free-to-air television and its "endless imitators" on subscription TV. Also that month, Fox Movie Channel changed its name back to FXM.

In June 2017, the 101-year-old actress Olivia de Havilland filed a lawsuit against FX Networks and producer Ryan Murphy for inaccurately portraying her and using her likeness without permission. On March 26, 2018, a California appeals court threw out the lawsuit on First Amendment grounds.

Expanding from the FX-BBC co-production of Taboo, in October 2018 FX agreed to give the BBC UK rights to all future and select current FX original scripted shows.

On December 14, 2017, The Walt Disney Company announced that it would acquire 21st Century Fox, including FX Networks, LLC. The acquisition was completed on March 20, 2019.  In a September 2018 interview with Variety of the Disney-Fox deal, Landgraf said, "I think this is a necessary step. I have curiosity and a bit of anxiety about how it will work, but I'm really excited about it.

In 2017, Comcast launched FX+; the service was shut down on August 20, 2019, with four shows shifting premieres to Hulu.  FX programming was moved to Hulu as "FX on Hulu" on March 2, 2020, with a limited number of shows.

Networks and Services

FX

FX, originally stylized as "fX", launched on June 1, 1994. The network's original programming aspires to the standards of premium cable channels in regard to mature themes and content, high-quality writing, directing and acting. FX also carries reruns of theatrical films and terrestrial-network sitcoms. The network broadcast from a large "apartment" in Manhattan's Flatiron District. fX was one of the first forays into large-scale interactive television. The channel centered on original programming, which was broadcast live every day from the "fX Apartment," and rebroadcasts of classic television shows from the 1960s, 1970s and 1980s, such as Batman, Wonder Woman, Eight Is Enough, Nanny and the Professor and The Green Hornet. fX had two taglines during this period: "TV Made Fresh Daily" and "The World's First Living Television Network". The "f" in the channel's name and logo was rendered in lower-case to portray a type of relaxed friendliness; the stylized "X" represented the channel's roots: the crossing searchlights of the 20th Century Fox logo.

The channel prided itself on its interactivity with viewers. fX, in 1994, was an early adopter of the internet, embracing e-mail and the World Wide Web as methods of feedback. Most of the shows would feature instant responses to e-mailed questions, and one show, Backchat (hosted by Jeff Probst), was exclusively devoted to responding to viewer mail, whether sent through e-mail or traditional postal mail.

FX Movie Channel

FX Movie Channel (or FXM) launched on October 31, 1994, as FXM: Movies from Fox (prior to its launch, the channel was originally named "Fox Movie Studio") Originally launched as a spinoff of FX, the channel focused on feature films from the 20th Century Fox film library from the 1930s to the 1970s along with a few other film studios. FXM became a separately branded channel on March 1, 2000, when it was renamed Fox Movie Channel.

On January 1, 2012, Fox Movie Channel's programming was divided into two 12-hour blocks: its main programming schedule, from 3:00 a.m. to 3:00 p.m. Eastern Time, was a commercial-free block retaining the older movies from the 20th Century Fox library. Another block, called FX Movie Channel, the other 12 hours consisted of an expanded slate of more recent feature films from Fox and some of the other film studios.

On March 27, 2013, Fox Entertainment Group announced that Fox Movie Channel would be fully rebranded under the FXM name and format. FX Movie Channel became the primary brand for the channel in September 2013; the classic film block retained the Fox Movie Channel name until June 9, 2014, when the block (which retains a commercial-free format) was renamed FXM Retro.

FXX

Aimed at young men in the 18-34 age range, FXX is a basic cable channel that launched on September 2, 2013, replacing the sports-oriented Fox Soccer; FXX is a general entertainment channel that primarily focuses on comedies (whereas FX focuses primarily on drama series and films, while FXX carries a limited selection of dramatic series and films); its programming includes original and acquired comedy series, some feature films and drama series.

With the launch of the channel, first-run episodes of some of FX's original comedy series (such as It's Always Sunny in Philadelphia and Totally Biased with W. Kamau Bell) were shifted over to FXX. At its launch, most providers that have agreements to carry FXX have placed the channel in extra-cost sports packages (despite being a general entertainment service) as an artifact of carriage deals with the previous holder of FXX's channel space, Fox Soccer; this has been resolved over time, with FX and FXX being located next to each other on some channel lineups.

FXNOW
FXNOW is a website for desktop computers, as well as an application for smartphones and tablet computers, along with Windows 10. It allows subscribers of participating pay television providers (such as Time Warner Cable and Comcast Xfinity) numerous viewing options:
individual episodes of FX and FXX's original series (which are made available the morning after their original airdate), 
acquired series (most notably, the 552-episode catalog of the first 25 seasons of The Simpsons, which was added on August 21, 2014, as part of FXX's acquisition of subscription syndication rights to the series, but has since been moved over to the Disney+ streaming service), and feature films (with an initial library of 165 film titles, which increased to more than 200 titles beginning in 2015), 
Additional content includes behind-the-scenes features on computers and mobile devices via their TV Everywhere login provided by their subscription provider.
The ability to watch Fox programming along was introduced in 2018, along with FX/FXX programming being added to the FOXNOW app, this feature was removed in March 2019, due to Disney acquiring FX Networks.

Launched in January 2014, the service is also available through iOS, Android, Samsung and Windows 8 (later Windows 10) devices, Xbox One and Xbox 360, and the Roku streaming player. Although the service is available for free to subscribers of participating subscription TV providers, shows available for streaming on FXNOW feature commercial interruption.

FX+
In September 2018, Fox officially launched FX+, a streaming service featuring all FX and FXX original series from The Shield to the present day ad-free. Initially, the service was made available in the United States exclusively for Xfinity subscribers in the fall of 2017. Xfinity, Armstrong and Cox subscribers have access to FX+ direct through their set-top boxes via those providers' video on demand platforms, in addition to the streaming options. In July 2019, it was announced on the service's website that it would cease being available on August 21, 2019, as a result of The Walt Disney Company's near-full acquisition of Hulu and move of FX content to that service; its ad-free model would otherwise be effectively duplicative with Hulu's commercial-free plan.

FX on Hulu
The FX content hub on Hulu (branded as FX on Hulu until December 2021) is an American content hub on the streaming platform Hulu that offers programming from FX Networks, a subsidiary of the Disney General Entertainment Content segment of The Walt Disney Company. Launched on March 2, 2020, the hub's programming is offered at no extra cost to Hulu subscribers. FX on Hulu features original programming produced by FX specifically for Hulu, in addition to past and current original shows seen on the linear FX and FXX cable networks. Hulu is majority-owned by Disney, the parent company of FX.

In November 2019, four shows were moved from Hulu: Devs, Mrs. America, A Teacher, and The Old Man. As part of the "first phase" (March 2–7, 2020), FX on Hulu rolled out with 40 current and library shows, with four original shows premiering on FX before being made available on Hulu the next day. Phase two began on April 15 with Mrs. America premiering along with two other original shows and a documentary series. The initial "FX on Hulu"-branded shows premiered on the FX cable network before being made available on Hulu the next day.

In December 2021, Disney began to phase out the "FX on Hulu" brand, resulting in the Hulu hub for FX and FXX programming being rebranded as simply "FX". Concurrently Disney began to use the FX label to promote its programs, especially in international markets on Disney+.

Programming 
Note that The Weekly / The New York Times Presents, which has been sometimes described as an "FX on Hulu" show, was jointly commissioned by FX and Hulu prior to the launch of the FX on Hulu hub, and is introduced with both services' logos, unlike FX on Hulu series which are introduced with only the FX logo.

FX Entertainment
FX Entertainment is the division of FX Networks that oversees original programming under the FX brand, including FX Productions. It was formed in May 2019 as part of FX Networks' executive restructuring following acquisition by Disney. On June 10, 2019, Disney announced that both FX Entertainment and Disney Television Studios would share the same casting division.

FX Productions 

FX Productions (FXP) is FX Networks' in-house production company. The studio currently produces series for FX, FXX, and FX on Hulu, as well as TBS (Miracle Workers). In the past, they have also made series for Amazon Prime Video (One Mississippi) and Fox (The Cool Kids).

International distribution 
As Hulu is only available in the United States, international availability of FX on Hulu content varies by region. Due to arrangements that predate the launch of Star, the general entertainment content hub on Disney+ that distributes Hulu original programming and FX content outside of the U.S, several FX on Hulu programs may be carried by third-party broadcasters instead.

In parts of Europe, FX on Hulu programming is distributed is through Star on Disney+; in Latin America, programming is available on its sister service Star+; and in India and parts of Southeast Asia, these programs are distributed by Disney+ Hotstar.

In Canada, almost all FX original programming premiere exclusively on the domestic versions of FX and FXX, as part of a previously established relationship between FX Networks and Rogers Sports and Media. Since the Star on Disney+ launch, all FX on Hulu original series air on Disney+.

There was some of FX content not available on Disney+ Star in Australia due to an output deal with Binge and its parent Foxtel. It has started ending in April 2022 with its FX shows pulled and migrating to Disney+.

Unavailable programming 
The FX hub on Hulu carries most series produced for FX and FXX from 2008 onwards, and certain other original programs (such as The Shield) produced from 2002 onward. Notable exceptions include:

 American Crime Story (2016–present) — Due to a 2016 agreement between 20th Century Fox Television (now 20th Television) and Netflix, which predates the Disney acquisition and the launch of FX on Hulu, Netflix held exclusive global SVOD streaming rights to the ACS franchise (except in Canada), with new instalments arriving on Netflix several months after they finish airing on FX; as such, ACS is not available via FX on Hulu. However, the series is available live and on-demand to Hulu + Live TV customers, as this package includes the FX linear channel. The first two seasons were pulled from Netflix worldwide at the end of February 2022 and did join FX on Hulu the following month. It has also shifted to Disney+'s Star hub internationally.
 The Americans (2013–18) — 21st Century Fox licensed the exclusive U.S. SVOD streaming rights for this series to Prime Video in 2014. It was added to Hulu on July 29, 2022.
 Louie (2010–2015) —  an Emmy-winning comedy drama created by Louis CK., is currently only available on CK's website.

References

External links

FX (US)
FX (Canada)
FX (Korea) 
 

 
Television networks in the United States
FX Networks
Companies based in California
Peabody Award winners
Disney television networks
Disney acquisitions
Former News Corporation subsidiaries
Former Liberty Media subsidiaries
Former AT&T subsidiaries
Cable network groups in the United States